Vula Ratuva Maimuri (born Nadroga, 3 November 1975), is a Fijian former rugby union player who played as lock.

Career

Club career
Maimuri first played for Northland in the National Provincial Championship between 1999 and 2002. In 2003, he moved in France to play for SU Agen until 2005. In 2006, Maimuri returned to New Zealand to play again for Northland. He also played for New Zealand Barbarians in 2002, as well for the Highlanders in 2001 and the Blues between 2002 and 2003.

International career
Maimuri first played for Fiji on 18 August, against Argentina, in Cordoba. He was also in the Fiji squad for the 2003 Rugby World Cup, playing four matches in the tournament, with the match against Scotland, on 1 November 2003, in Sydney being his last international cap.

External links
Vula Maimuri international statistics
Vula Maimuri at New Zealand Rugby History
Vula Maimuri profile - L'équipe

1975 births
Living people
Fijian rugby union players
Rugby union locks
Northland rugby union players
Fiji international rugby union players
People from Nadroga-Navosa Province